South Carolina Highway 403 (SC 403) is a  primary state highway in the U.S. state of South Carolina. It serves the town of Timmonsville and the surrounding rural area with the cities of Lake City and Hartsville.

Route description
SC 403 is a two-lane rural highway that traverses for  beginning north of Lake City, along SC 341.  Going through a northeasterly direction to Hobbs Crossroads, it then goes north to Sardis.  Connecting with Interstate 95 (I-95) north of Sardis, it continues north connecting with U.S. Route 76 (US 76) near and then through Timmonsville.  At Windhams Crossroads, it connects with US 401, where it provides access to I-20.  At Lees Crossroads, it reaches its northern terminus, an intersection with US 15/SC 34. The vast majority of the landscape along the route is farmland, with the exception in and around Timmonsville.

History

SC 403 was established in 1933 as a renumbering of US 301 from US 76 in Timmonsville to US 15 at Lees Crossroads. The entire route was paved in 1939. Around 1942, SC 403 was extended south SC 407 in Sparrows Crossroads. In 1948, SC 403 was retracted back to its original routing, leaving behind Hill Road (S-21-38). Between 1968-1970, SC 403 was extended south to its current southern terminus with SC 341, replacing part of SC 53 and nearly all of SC 309.

South Carolina Highway 309

South Carolina Highway 309 (SC 309) was an  state highway that was established in 1940 as a new primary routing, from SC 341 in Hobbs Crossroads, southeast to U.S. Route 301 (US 301). By 1942, it was extended southeast to reconnect with SC 341. Between 1968 and 1970, SC 309 was decommissioned and renumbered as an extension of SC 403 with only its westernmost piece downgraded to secondary road (Lynches River Road; S-42-14).

Major intersections

See also

References

External links

 
 Mapmikey's South Carolina Highways Page: Former SC 309
 Mapmikey's South Carolina Highways Page: SC 403
 Mapmikey's South Carolina Highways Page: Former SC 403 Alt.

403
Transportation in Florence County, South Carolina
Transportation in Sumter County, South Carolina
Transportation in Darlington County, South Carolina
U.S. Route 301